This is a list of the German Media Control Top100 Singles Chart number-ones of 1992.

Number-one hits by week

Notes

References

External links
 German Singles Chart Archives from 1956
 Media Control Chart Archives from 1960

Number one hits
Germany hits
1992
1992